Frozen in Time is the sixth album by American death metal band Obituary. It was released on July 12, 2005, and was the band's first album in eight years since 1997's Back from the Dead, and the last to feature guitarist Allen West.

Longtime contributor Scott Burns (who had not worked with Obituary since 1994's World Demise) reunited with the band as the producer for this album, though it would be the last time they would work with him as he retired from producing after its release.

A music video was made for the song "Insane".

Track listing

Personnel
John Tardy - vocals
Allen West - lead guitar
Trevor Peres - rhythm guitar
Frank Watkins - bass
Donald Tardy - drums

Charts

Monthly

References

External links
Frozen in Time at Media Club

2005 albums
Obituary (band) albums
Albums produced by Scott Burns (record producer)
Roadrunner Records albums